Richard Nephew is an American nuclear weapons and sanctions expert who is a program director at the Center on Global Energy Policy (CGEP) at Columbia University and a Senior Research Scholar teaching at School of International and Public Affairs, Columbia University. He is the author of The Art of Sanctions, a book from CGEP's Columbia University Press book series. On July 5, 2022, he was named the Coordinator on Global Anti-Corruption by U.S. Secretary of State Antony Blinken.

Education
Nephew has a bachelor's degree in international affairs and a master's degree in security policy studies, both from The George Washington University.

Career
After graduating from university, Nephew began at the National Nuclear Security Administration where he worked on international nuclear affairs from June 2003 to June 2006. He then joined the Bureau of International Security and Nonproliferation at the State Department, staying until May 2011. Nephew was then transferred to the National Security Council as the Director for Iranian Affairs for two years. In January 2013, he was named as the Principal Deputy Coordinator for Sanctions Policy at the Department of State, as the lead sanctions expert in negotiations with Iran from August 2013 to December 2014. On February 1, 2015, left his career in government and joined the Center on Global Energy Policy. Additionally, Nephew is a non-resident senior fellow at the Brookings Institution.

Awards
Nephew has received numerous awards from the US Department of State and the US Department of Energy, including the Secretary of State's Award for Excellence in International Security in 2008, for his work on UN Security Council Resolution.

Book
 The Art of Sanctions: A View from the Field (Columbia University Press, 2017)

References

External links

Living people
Columbia School of International and Public Affairs faculty
21st-century American non-fiction writers
American political writers
Year of birth missing (living people)